The 15th Genie Awards were held in 1994.

Nominees and winners
The Genie Award nominees, with winners in each category shown in bold text:

References

External links 
Genie Awards 1994 on imdb 

15
Genie
Genie